The 2012–13 season was Klubi i Futbollit Tirana's 74th competitive season, 74th consecutive season in the Kategoria Superiore and 92nd year in existence as a football club. Following the title win four seasons ago, KF Tirana added to their 23 titles to make it their record 24th title win. KF Tirana played UEFA Europa League against CS Grevenmacher and Aalesunds FK.

2012
The club could get organized better for the current season, starting from Europa League participation. Even though having a healthy budget, club officials were too late to bring quality players on time, adding here the fact that they let go of main attacker, Bekim Balaj for a funny transfer sum to AC Sparta Prague despite Balaj still had six month of contract left. And lost few other players, however, they have the merit to keep team's core and also bringing some new arrivals, all for sake of achieving the title after three years drought. Tirana managed to pass only one round in Europa League, eliminating CS Grevenmacher of Luxembourg, before being knocked out from Norwegians of Aalesunds FK in the 2nd round. Tirana won again the Supercup (their jubilee 10th trophy), by beating on their 3rd final clash KF Skënderbeu Korçë. Despite due to extend his link with Tirana for the following two seasons and continuing the project, the successful Spanish coach, Rubio, did not sign that contract officially, due to some clauses on which himself and the club did not agree and eventually him and the club departed ways after over 13 months cooperation. Artur Lekbello was appointed Tirana new coach, but despite his credits as a player in the past, he did not prove that successful as a coach and therefore presented his resignation to club administrator after only 42 days, following unpleasant results in Tirana's bench. Alban Tafaj once again took the vacant place as a temporary coach. The end of the year 2012 found KF Tirana in the 3rd spot of 2012-13 Kategoria Superiore, 11 points adrift leaders KF Skënderbeu Korçë.
Tirana were also eliminated early in the Cup. After passed KF Partizani at the first round winning both matches, 2-1 and 1-0 they were eliminated at second round from debut team, FK Kukësi losing first leg 0-4 and winning second one 3-2.

Background

Kit
Supplier: Errea
Sponsor: Municipality of Tirana, American Hospital, Lajthiza Water, Belle Air, Tirana Brewing House, Tirana Dekor,

Other information

Coaching staff

Players

2012–13 squad

Out on loan

International players

Foreign players

Reserves and academy

Competitions

Albanian Supercup

Kategoria Superiore

League table

Results summary

Results by round

Matches

Albanian Cup

First round

Second round

UEFA Europa League

First qualifying round

Second qualifying round

References

2012-13
Albanian football clubs 2012–13 season